Fantabulous may refer to:
 Fantabulous Inc., a 1967 crime film
Fantabulous (album), a 1964 album by Oliver Nelson
Fantabulous, a cross between fantastic and fabulous